Lorgies is a commune in the Pas-de-Calais department in the Hauts-de-France region of France.

Geography

Population

Places of interest
 The church of St. Mathieu, rebuilt in 1931.
 Le Bourg chapel.

See also
Communes of the Pas-de-Calais department

References

External links

 The CWGC graves in the communal cemetery of Lorgies

Communes of Pas-de-Calais